Kieran Crotty (20 August 1930 – 22 July 2022) was an Irish Fine Gael politician who served as a Teachta Dála (TD) for the Carlow–Kilkenny constituency from 1969 to 1989.

Crotty was first elected to the Dáil following the 1969 general election as a Fine Gael TD for Carlow–Kilkenny. His father Patrick Crotty was a TD for Carlow–Kilkenny from 1948 to 1969. He was re-elected six times, at the 1973, 1977, 1981, February 1982, November 1982 and 1987 general elections. He did not contest the 1989 general election.

He was elected as Mayor of Kilkenny for six one-year-terms between 1970 and 1995.

He died on 22 July 2022, at the age of 91.

See also
Families in the Oireachtas

References

1930 births
2022 deaths
Fine Gael TDs
Local councillors in County Kilkenny
Politicians from County Kilkenny
Kilkenny
People from Kilkenny (city)
Members of the 19th Dáil
Members of the 20th Dáil
Members of the 21st Dáil
Members of the 22nd Dáil
Members of the 23rd Dáil
Members of the 24th Dáil
Members of the 25th Dáil
Kilkenny inter-county hurlers